Theodoros Moschonas (born 3 December 1990) is a Greek former football goalkeeper.

Career
Moschonas began playing professional football with AEK Athens F.C. in 2007. On 1 January 2010, he went on a six-month loan to Elpidoforos to gain experience. At the end of the season. he returned to AEK. At the end of 2012–13 season, AEK was relegated and Moschonas left the club on a free transfer.
On 7 August 2013, he signed for newly promoted Fostiras in the Football League.
In July 2014, he signed for Levadiakos in the Superleague (Greece 1st Division)

External links
 Scoresway Profile
 Myplayer.gr Profile
 Onsports Profile

1990 births
Living people
Footballers from Athens
Greek footballers
Super League Greece players
AEK Athens F.C. players
Levadiakos F.C. players
Kallithea F.C. players
Association football goalkeepers